Ørteren is a lake in the municipality of Hol in Viken county, Norway.

Location 
Ørteren is located in Hardangervidda. Norwegian National Road 7 runs along the east side of the Lake.

Power Plant 
Ørteren is regulated for Ørteren Kraftverk, a hydroelectric power plant at Haugastøl. The power plant utilizes a drop of 160 meters between Ørteren and Sløtfjorden. It went into production in 1966. The dam and the intake were built by Oslo Energi and are currently operated by E- CO.

References

See also
List of lakes in Norway

Lakes of Viken (county)